Olen may refer to:

Places
Olen, Belgium, a municipality in the province of Antwerp, Belgium
Olen, Russia, a village in Tula Oblast, Russia
Ølen, a former municipality in the county of Rogaland, Norway
Ølensjøen, a village formerly within that municipality also known as "Ølen"
Ølen Church, in the village
Olën Park, a stadium in Potchefstroom, South Africa

People
Olen (poet) (c. 1000 BCE), a Greek poet of legend from Lycia

Helaine Olen (born mid-1960s), American journalist and author
Eric Olen (born 1980), American basketball coach
Lairenjam Olen (born 1973), Indian actor
Otto L. Olen (1867–1946), American politician from Wisconsin

Fred Olen Ray (born 1954), American filmmaker
Frederick Olen Mercer (1901–1966), US federal judge
Robert Olen Butler (born 1945), American fiction writer
Robert Olen Butler Prize, writing prize with winners selected by Butler

Olen Lovell Burrage (1930–2013), American businessman suspected of three murders
Olen Steinhauer (born 1970), American fiction writer
Olen Underwood (born 1942), an American football player

See also
Olene, a genus of moths